Wendy Ng Yan Yee (born 11 July 1993) is a Malaysian diver.

Career

Early beginning
Ng begin diving at the age of 13 at Bandar Tun Razak Swimming Pool. She was a rhythmic gymnast but her talent was spotted by the national coach, Yang Zhuliang due to her "physical build was good for diving".

2012 Summer Olympics
She competed 3 m springboard at the 2012 Summer Olympics.

2016 Summer Olympics
Ng finished 11th in 3 metre springboard at the 2015 World Aquatics Championships in Kazan, Russia and qualify for the 2016 Summer Olympics.

Ng went through the 3 metre springboard preliminary round at a ranking of 17, finishes 5th place at the semifinals and lastly ranking at 10th place for the finals.

2017 Southeast Asian Games
In diving at the 2017 Southeast Asian Games, Ng came in first place in the mixed 3 metre springboard synchro, but was stripped of the gold medal after testing positive for sibutramine. The gold medal was subsequently awarded to fellow Malaysian divers Muhammad Syafiq Puteh and Jasmine Lai Pui Yee. Though not generally considered a performance-enhancing drug, sibutramine is listed in the World Anti-Doping Code as a banned substance. In March 2018, FINA announced that Ng would be suspended from the sport for eight months. As a result, she was unable to compete in diving at the 2018 Commonwealth Games.

2020 Summer Olympics
Ng competed in diving at the 2020 Summer Olympics in 2021 in Tokyo, Japan. In the women's 3m springboard, she finished 20th with a score of 251.95 points in the preliminaries, and so did not advance to the semifinals.

References 

Sportspeople from Kuala Lumpur
1993 births
Living people
Malaysian sportspeople of Chinese descent
Divers at the 2012 Summer Olympics
Divers at the 2016 Summer Olympics
Divers at the 2020 Summer Olympics
Olympic divers of Malaysia
Malaysian female divers
Asian Games medalists in diving
Divers at the 2010 Asian Games
Divers at the 2014 Asian Games
Divers at the 2018 Asian Games
Asian Games silver medalists for Malaysia
Divers at the 2010 Commonwealth Games
Divers at the 2014 Commonwealth Games
Divers at the 2022 Commonwealth Games
Commonwealth Games medallists in diving
Commonwealth Games silver medallists for Malaysia
Medalists at the 2010 Asian Games
Medalists at the 2014 Asian Games
Medalists at the 2018 Asian Games
Southeast Asian Games gold medalists for Malaysia
Southeast Asian Games silver medalists for Malaysia
Southeast Asian Games medalists in diving
Competitors at the 2011 Southeast Asian Games
Competitors at the 2013 Southeast Asian Games
Competitors at the 2015 Southeast Asian Games
Competitors at the 2019 Southeast Asian Games
Competitors at the 2021 Southeast Asian Games
Medallists at the 2022 Commonwealth Games